Alfredo Megido Sánchez (born 2 October 1952), also known simply as Megido, is a Spanish former footballer who played as a forward and made one appearance for the Spain national team.

Career
Megido made his only appearance for Spain on 5 February 1975 in a UEFA Euro 1976 qualifying match against Scotland, which finished as a 1–1 draw. He scored the equalising goal for Spain in the 67th minute, after having just been substituted on a minute prior.

Career statistics

International

International goals

References

External links
 
 
 
 

1952 births
Living people
People from Vega del Guadalquivir
Sportspeople from the Province of Seville
Spanish footballers
Footballers from Andalusia
Association football forwards
La Liga players
Segunda División players
Sporting de Gijón B players
Sporting de Gijón players
Granada CF footballers
Real Betis players
Málaga CF players
Hércules CF players
Ligue 1 players
FC Girondins de Bordeaux players
Spain amateur international footballers
Spain international footballers
Spanish expatriate footballers
Spanish expatriate sportspeople in France
Expatriate footballers in France